Sultan is a 2016 Indian Hindi-language sports drama film directed by Ali Abbas Zafar. Produced by Aditya Chopra under the Yash Raj Films banner, the film stars Salman Khan and Anushka Sharma. It focuses on Sultan Ali Khan, a fictional pehlwani wrestler and former world wrestling champion from Haryana whose successful career has created a rift in his personal life.

The film was released worldwide on 6 July 2016. It received positive reviews from critics and has grossed  worldwide, and is the  10th highest-grossing Indian film ever.

Plot 
Sultan Ali Khan is a middle-aged local wrestler and ex-wrestling champion living a lonely life in a small town of Rewari, Haryana. Aakash Oberoi, the founder of a private mixed martial arts league backed by Mr. Patel, is encouraged by his father to recruit Sultan to salvage its popularity. After traveling to Haryana, he gives the recruitment offer to Sultan, who bluntly refuses and says that he has completely retired from wrestling. In search of the reason behind his retirement, Aakash confronts Sultan's close friend Govind, who narrates how Sultan's career began.

According to Govind, in 2008, Sultan fell in love at the sight of Aarfa Hussain, a state-level wrestler and the daughter of a local wrestling coach. Although she is initially cold towards him, she accepts Sultan as a friend. When he claims that they are committed, she insults him, saying she would only marry a well-trained wrestler. Determined to win her respect, Sultan dedicates himself to intense training and ultimately wins a state-level wrestling tournament, as well as Aarfa. The two get married and become recognized wrestlers, representing India in various international games.

When the two are selected for the Olympic contingent, Aarfa discovers that she's pregnant. She gives up her childhood dream of winning an Olympic gold medal for India, which Sultan then fulfills. To her surprise, Sultan's accomplishment makes him arrogant, and he slaps a reporter at an event. He also leaves Aarfa nearing her due date to win a gold at Turkey. Upon returning, he finds that his newborn son had died due to severe anemia. The baby had a rare O- blood type, identical to Sultan's, whose absence deprived the child of a donor. Angered, Aarfa decides to leave Sultan and reside with her father. Depressed from losing his wife and child, Sultan raises funds to open a blood bank of his son's name.

In the present day, Aakash promises Sultan that the tournament's prize money will fulfill his dream of opening a blood bank. Sultan agrees to participate and travels to train in Delhi, where Aakash introduces him to MMA coach Fateh Singh, who initially refuses him but agrees after seeing his determination. After two months of training, Sultan regains his physique and learns how to wrestle freestyle. In his first fight, Sultan defeats the opponent using capoeira style. He soon becomes a nationwide sensation by winning a series of matches and gaining Aarfa's support in the process.

During the semi-final round against opponent Tyron Woodley, Sultan wins the fight but is severely injured and has to be hospitalized. The doctor informs Aakash that Sultan should not fight again lest his injuries become fatal. Aarfa arrives at the ward and motivates him to continue fighting. During the final match, Sultan overcomes his pain to defeat his opponent and ultimately wins the tournament. Reunited with his wife, Sultan opens a blood bank using the prize money, and Aarfa resumes wrestling. A few years later, she gives birth to a baby girl, who Sultan begins to train as a wrestler.

Cast 
 Salman Khan as Sultan Ali Khan,  Aarfa's husband
 Anushka Sharma as Aarfa Ali Khan (née Hussain), Sultan's wife
 Randeep Hooda as Fateh Singh, Sultan's coach
 Amit Sadh as Aakash Oberoi, Pro Takedown founder, and Sultan's presenter
 Murari Lal Pareek
 Marko Zaror as Marcus (Finalist Wrestler)
 Naveen Ohlyan as Sultan's father
 Tyron Woodley as Tyron (Himself) (wrestler)
 Marrese Crump as Marrese (Himself) (wrestler)
 Kumud Mishra as Barkat Hussain, Aarfa's father; Sultan's father-in-law
 Suzi Khan as Sultan & Aarfa's daughter
 Sumeet Samnani as Tiny Kukreja, Sultan's sponsor
 Anant Vidhaat as Govind, Sultan's friend
 Ivan Rodrigues as Mr. Patel
 Karmveer Choudhary as Haryana government sports officer
 Parikshat Sahni as Gyan Singh Oberoi, Akash's father
 Ashish Raja as Rajveer
 Arwind Wahi as Inter State Coach
 Himanshu Bhutiyani as Doctor at Safdarjang Hospital
 Alexandria Liles as Jade (wrestler) from South Africa
 Meiyang Chang as himself (commentator)
 Kubra Sait as herself (anchor/commentator)
 Shibani Dandekar as herself (news reporter)
 Candice Redding as a Band member in 'Jag Ghoomeya'
 Amit Raj (Guest appearance)

Production

Development 
The project was earlier announced in June 2015 with a teaser released on YouTube. Khan will be seen portraying a Haryana-based wrestler in the film. To prepare for the film, Khan underwent wrestling training under the guidance of Larnell Stovall.

Casting 
In October 2015, there were reports of American actor Sylvester Stallone being cast in the film as Khan's on-screen coach. However, Raja Mukerji, the Executive Producer of the film cleared that Stallone would not be starring in the film. Later, Sanjay Dutt was then rumored to play the role of coach according to Khan's insistence. However, Khan later reported that he never insisted Aditya Chopra for Dutt's role.

In December 2015, Randeep Hooda was later signed to play the role of Khan's coach in the film. Amit Sadh of Kai Po Che! fame was reportedly signed for the role of young Sultan. However, in March 2016, he confirmed that he is playing the role of Khan's younger brother. MMA fighter Tyron Woodley has been signed opposite Khan with other fighters in the film.

In January 2016, Anushka Sharma was signed to play the female lead role opposite Khan. For her role as a wrestler, Sharma took wrestling lessons for the film. In February 2016, Bosco-Caesar were signed as the choreographers of the film, replacing Vaibhavi Merchant who left the film due to personal commitments.

Filming 

Pre-production of the film started in October 2015 where Khan posted a photo of his character in the film on Facebook. Principal photography of the film started in December 2015 at ND Studios, Karjat and JW Marriott Mumbai, where the film's first schedule was filmed. Filming of the first schedule had been completed in late December 2015. Filming of the second schedule was started in January 2016 where Khan filmed for action sequences. A song was filmed in early March 2016, choreographed by Farah Khan. An action sequence between Khan and Sharma was reportedly filmed. Some of the sequence of the movie will feature 360-year-old Jama Masjid of Delhi. In late April 2016 the lead actor Salman Khan was seen riding a scooter as a part of shooting in Muzaffarnagar, Uttar Pradesh.

Music 

The music for Sultan is composed by Vishal–Shekhar while the lyrics are penned by Irshad Kamil. The soundtrack album was released on 31 May 2016. The album features fourteen songs, with nine of them were included with the original soundtrack. On 6 June 2016, four songs are sung by Salman Khan were released after the release of the original soundtrack. The bonus track "Raula Paye Gaya," which was sung by Rahat Fateh Ali Khan was released on 30 June 2016.

Box office

Worldwide 
The film grossed approx  from its first 3 days, becoming the first Indian film to do so.
It grossed around 328crore from its extended 5-day opening weekend. , the movie grossed 416crore in India and $24 million overseas, becoming the fourth-highest-grossing Indian film of all time. The film's worldwide gross was  prior to its China release, including  in India and  overseas. , following its China release, the film has grossed  worldwide.

India 
Sultan created a new record for advance bookings.
On its day of release, Sultan received an average of 70% audience occupancy and netted approximately 36.54crore. By the end of its second week, the film had netted an estimated 278crore. Its final domestic gross was 421.25crore.

Overseas 
In the United Kingdom, it opened with over £1 million and went on to gross £1.8 million by the end of the year, making it the UK's second highest-grossing foreign-language film of 2016 (below Dangal). , the film had earned  in Germany.

By 3 August 2016, Sultan had made $24.2 million (161 crore) overseas gross, making it the sixth-highest-grossing Indian film in overseas markets. Its overseas gross was  prior to its China release.

In China, where the film released on 31 August 2018, the film grossed  as of 16 September 2018. The film peaked at number seven on the weekly China box office chart, during the week ending 9 September 2018. , the film has grossed  overseas.

Game 
An official game based on this film has been released by 99Games for Android mobile phones.

Piracy 
On 6 July 2016, the film's digital copy was reported to be available in the darknet. Confirming that the copy was created from the sample sent by the producers to the CBFC board for review, cyber crime experts investigating the leak said, "The leak is confirmed. The copy of the movie is available on the darknet, and soon it will be available on torrent." However, Yash Raj Films, the film's producer, denied such development. Kislay Chaudhary, a private investigator, claimed that the links of the 2-hour-36-minute-long movie were available, and shared the screenshot of the same with Mail Today. "Many websites have been blocked since Tuesday evening, and links were removed immediately," he added.

Awards and nominations

Notes

References

External links 
 
 
 
 Sultan at Yash Raj Films

2010s sports drama films
2016 action drama films
2016 romantic drama films
Indian martial arts films
2016 films
Indian sports drama films
Indian romantic action films
Films shot in Maharashtra
Yash Raj Films films
2010s Hindi-language films
Films set in Haryana
Films shot in Haryana
Indian action drama films
Films scored by Vishal–Shekhar
Mixed martial arts films
Indian romantic drama films
Sport wrestling films
Films directed by Ali Abbas Zafar
2016 martial arts films
Wrestling in India